Galba viatrix is a species of air-breathing freshwater snail, an aquatic pulmonate gastropod mollusk in the family Lymnaeidae, the pond snails.

References

External links

Lymnaeidae
Gastropods described in 1835